Perry K. Generating Station is a small multi-fired power station producing steam for one of the largest central district steam heating systems in the United States. The plant is located on the south side of downtown Indianapolis, at the intersection of Kentucky Avenue and West Street. Its coal-fired units were among the oldest operating power plants in the United States at the time, and were converted to natural gas in 2016. Perry K. is owned by Citizens Thermal, a division of Citizens Energy Group.

History
In 1892–1893, the Indianapolis Light and Power Company, a predecessor of the Indianapolis Power and Light Company (IPL), constructed a generating plant on Kentucky Avenue near the intersection with West Street. The $300,000 plant, originally known as the "Kentucky Avenue Plant", had a capacity of 1,120 kilowatts. Its output was initially used for street and commercial lighting, but in 1905 the plant was modified to provide steam for the district heating of a number of downtown businesses.

A plant expansion in 1937 included the installation of 650 psig boilers and the use of pulverized coal. That same year the Kentucky Avenue plant and the nearby West plant at 744 West Washington Avenue were renamed as Sections K and W, respectively, of the Charles C. Perry Plant.

In 2000, IPL sold the district heating system and the Perry K plant to Citizens Gas and Coke Utility (later renamed as Citizens Energy Group).

See also

 List of power stations in Indiana

References

External links

Energy infrastructure completed in 1925
Energy infrastructure completed in 1938
Buildings and structures in Indianapolis
Towers in Indiana
Coal-fired power stations in Indiana
1925 establishments in Indiana
District heating in the United States